Heroes of the Storm is a crossover multiplayer online battle arena video game developed and published by Blizzard Entertainment. It was released for OS X and Windows on June 2, 2015. The game features various characters from Blizzard's franchises as playable heroes, as well as different battlegrounds based on Warcraft, Diablo, StarCraft, and Overwatch universes.

Players form into five-player teams and fight against another team in 5-versus-5 matches, with an average game duration of roughly 20 minutes. The first team to destroy opponents' main structure, known as the "King's Core", wins the match. Each themed battleground has a different metagame and secondary objectives to secure, whose completion gives your team massive advantages, typically through pushing power. Every player controls a single character, known as a "hero", with a set of distinctive abilities and differing styles of play. Heroes become more powerful over the course of a match by collecting experience points and unlocking "talents" that offer new abilities or augment existing ones, contributing to the team's overall strategy.

Heroes of the Storm is inspired by Defense of the Ancients, a community-created mod based on Warcraft III, another video game developed by Blizzard Entertainment. The game is free-to-play and is supported by microtransactions which can be used to purchase heroes, visual alterations for the heroes in the game, mounts, and other cosmetic elements. Blizzard used to call the game as a "hero brawler" instead of the more common "multiplayer online battle arena" (MOBA), but later started using the latter term.

As of July 2022, Blizzard had stopped all major development of the game and entered it into maintenance mode.

Gameplay

Heroes of the Storm revolves around online 5-versus-5 matches, operated through online gaming service Battle.net, with an average game duration of roughly 20 minutes. In every match, players work together as a team to achieve the ultimate victory condition of destroying the opposing team's main structure, the "Core", before enemy team does the same. To reach the Core, at least one line of defensive structures, known as "forts" and "keeps", needs to be destroyed. Players can use the assistance of mercenary camps, battleground bosses, and a small group of computer-controlled units, called "minions", to assault the enemy more efficiently. Minions periodically spawn throughout the game in groups, marching along the lanes toward the enemy base. There are currently 15 battlegrounds available to play, each of which has different metagame and secondary objectives to secure. Completing these secondary objectives can give your team massive advantages, typically through pushing power.

In all game modes, each player controls one of the 90 playable characters (as of November 2020), called "heroes", with each having a unique design, strengths, and weaknesses. Heroes are divided into six separate roles: tank, bruiser, ranged assassin, melee assassin, healer, and support. Initially, no heroes are permanently available for use; however, players may choose from a list of heroes that are free to use from a weekly rotation. By using the in-game currency, called "Gold", or through microtransactions, they can gain permanent access to a hero.

Each individual hero comes with a set of distinctive abilities. Ability kit is generally composed of three basic abilities usable right from level 1, a passive or active trait, and a powerful "heroic ability". Upon reaching level 10, players can choose between two "heroics" which often have a devastating effect and a long cooldown. Heroics are usually the strongest tools in an arsenal that define a hero's strengths and playstyle. A hero can only gain one type of heroic per match. If a hero runs out of health points and dies, they are removed from active play until a respawn timer counts down to zero, after which they subsequently respawn at the rear of their team's base, known as the "Hall of Storms". Furthermore, the Hall of Storms allows heroes to quickly restore their health and mana over time as long as they are within the Hall. The Hall also offers protection from enemy damage and effects, and enemy players are repelled outward a slight distance in a sudden fashion upon entering an opposing team's Hall.

Experience points, which players can gain by gathering experience globes from fallen minions, are shared across the entire team. This is uncommon for the MOBA genre, in which most games employ a system of separate, per-player experience and leveling. In addition, certain enemy structures, such as towers, forts and keeps, will provide experience to the team who destroys them, as well as captured mercenary camps. When a team during the course of the match reaches a certain experience point threshold, every hero on that team levels up, acquiring slightly amplified powers, up to a maximum level of 30. Every few levels, players may select a "talent" which offers a new ability or augments an existing one. Two significant power spikes are at level 10 and level 20, where heroes gain access to some of the most powerful talents in the game, referred to as "heroic" and "storm talents", respectively. This leveling system emphasizes the importance of teamwork and planning since a player's action can affect the whole team.

In addition to the talent system, each player is able to use a "Hearthstone", an ability that allows heroes to teleport back to their base from anywhere on the battleground after a few seconds of channeling without receiving damage, using abilities, or attacking. Players can also utilize various mounts, such as animals, bikes, and clouds, to increase their movement speed, automatically dismounting when attacking, receiving damage or using most abilities.

Game modes
Heroes of the Storm includes several game modes from which players can choose, including the option to play either against computer-controlled Heroes or other players.
 Tutorials - The tutorials are composed of three scripted 'levels' that are aimed at new players with the intent of teaching movement, use of abilities and other basic controls. The player controls Jim Raynor, who is teleported from the StarCraft universe into the Nexus, receiving instructions from Uther Lightbringer from the Warcraft series.
 Training - A reduced experience mode where a player teams up with four AI teammates against five AI opponents set at the Beginner difficulty.
 Versus A.I. - Players face off against five AI opponents. Before starting the match, the player can choose to have human-controlled or AI allies. The difficulty setting of the AI can also be chosen prior to initiating a match.
 Quick Match - Players choose their heroes before entering the match without knowing what map they are playing, or what heroes they will be matched with and against. This mode sets two teams of five human-controlled heroes against each other on a random map in player versus player (PvP) style combat. These teams are selected based on the player's past performance to create an even playing field, as well as the roles of heroes chosen. For example, if a player queues without other party members as a Support, they are extremely unlikely to be matched with four other Support teammates.
 Unranked Draft - Before the start of an Unranked Draft game, opposing teams must engage in a "draft", alternating in choosing characters for each team's respective composition of 5 Heroes. As this draft progresses, each team is aware of the choices of the other, as well as the battleground the game on which the game will be played. This invites a higher level of skill in which players must wisely choose their characters according to the compositions of each team and their knowledge of how the various battlegrounds differ. Throughout the draft, each team may ban a total of 3 Heroes, prohibiting either team from picking these Heroes for the remainder of the draft. Unranked Draft is often seen as a mode to introduce players to a system more similar to the ranked Storm League mode than Quick Match, but without the risk of a player potentially altering their MMR.
 Storm League - Storm League uses a draft phase before gameplay which functions identically to the draft system used in Unranked Draft; however, players are chosen to play with and against each other based on rankings established through their past Storm League performance. Players are ranked in leagues from Bronze (lowest) to Grand Master (highest) based on their in-game performance. Each league below Master (the second-highest league) is divided into 5 subcategories, referred to as divisions. These divisions number 1-5, with 1 being the highest-ranked and 5 being the lowest-ranked. Within Master, divisions are not used. Instead, players are sorted directly by their MMR points, and the top 100 Master-ranked players who have won at least 35 games in the current season are considered Grand Masters. An online leaderboard maintained by Blizzard shows the list of current Grand Master players in each major region, updated nightly. Players who choose to play competitively as an individual or as part of a team of up to 5 players can play in a Storm League match to be matched with other players in the region of their choice. In order to play in Storm League, players must have access to 16 heroes at hero-level 5 or higher and have an account-level of 50 or higher. Heroes that the player does not technically own but has unlocked through the weekly rotation of free Heroes count toward the requisite 16 Heroes. As players compete in these matches, they will be awarded rank points which will alter their rank and be used to match them against other players of similar rankings. Player rank is expressed in the form of League Tiers and Divisions, and this rank is assigned separately for each individual player. Rank is determined by the player's MMR directly and adjusted by penalties, such as Leaver Penalty. The first official Ranked Play season began on June 14, 2016, and ended on September 13. Each Ranked Play season is set to last for approximately 3–4 months.
 Heroes Brawl - Added on October 18, 2016, this game mode had three different subcategories with varying rules. Completing 3 games of Heroes Brawl each week would earn the player a reward of one loot box. Heroes Brawl was removed as an available game mode on September 8, 2020, and replaced with ARAM. While the game mode was active, the rules of Heroes Brawl would change every week, including the following variations:
 Arenas - Players pick one of three (mostly) randomly selected Heroes and try to complete the objective. The first team to complete the objective will claim victory. The first to win two rounds wins the match. There are multiple arena maps exclusively designed for this mode. The Hero options given to the players are not entirely random, as certain characters are banned from the game mode, and certain precautions have been made to ensure team balance. For example, if one team is offered the choice of a healer-role Hero, the other team will be offered a healer as well.
 Mutators - Unique mechanics change the way you play on existing Battlegrounds. For example, one version allowed players to play the game using only "mages", or Heroes who primarily focus on dealing damage via magic rather than supporting their allies or dealing damage through more physical means.
 Single-Lanes - One-lane Battlegrounds with no objectives other than the destruction of the enemy's structures. Heroes are chosen using the same "choose from three" method employed in the Arenas subcategory of Heroes Brawl. Usage of the "Hearthstone" to teleport to the Hall of Storms is disabled, and the Hall of Storms provides no healing or mana restoration, although it will still grant immunity damage and disabling effects to players within its area. Due to the altered geography of a single-lane battleground drastically changing the strategy necessary to win the game and subsequently the game's balance between characters, certain Heroes have been restricted from the pool of available characters to choose at the start of the game.
ARAM - Added on September 8, 2020, ARAM (All Random, All Mid) is functionally identical to the aforementioned Single-Lanes game mode of Heroes Brawl. Thus, the shift from Heroes Brawl to ARAM amounted to an effective removal of the Arenas and Mutator subcategories of Heroes Brawl.
 Custom Games - Often used for tournament play, players can create a lobby and make a predetermined match-up of up to five players versus five players, with the ability to choose the map, whether to enable draft mode, and whether to add AI-controlled heroes and/or allow up to six observers.

Matchmaking
Matchmaking is based on the Elo rating system with proprietary adjustments. MMR (matchmaking rating) is calculated individually for each player, and it is tracked separately for every game mode. In ranked mode matchmaker tries to place players with similar ratings together, while generally attempts to balance both teams based on each player's MMR to find and create even games.

Business model
Heroes of the Storm is free-to-play, based on the freemium business model, and is supported by micropayments using three in-game currencies: "Gems", "Gold", and "Shards". Gold is in-game currency that can be earned by playing the game, completing daily, seasonal and event quests, and leveling up (Loot Chests can be acquired in the same way). Gold can be used to buy heroes, gold-only mounts, hero mastery rings, Loot Chests and Shards. Gems can be earned in-game or purchased with real money, and Shards are acquired from duplicate items from Loot Chests or purchased with Gold. Players can use either Gems or Shards to buy skins, mounts and other cosmetic elements, such as banners, sprays, announcers, voice lines, emojis, and portraits. Heroes, as the only category in Collection with a material effect on gameplay, may be purchased by either Gems or Gold.

Gem-only items in Collection are "bundles" (dynamic groups of Heroes of the Storm content), and "boosts" (formerly called "stimpacks") which increase Gold and account experience earned per match.

Development

As a part of the arcade feature for StarCraft II: Wings of Liberty, a custom map called "Blizzard DOTA" was announced alongside several other mods of Blizzard Entertainment at BlizzCon 2010. At that time, the map was developed to showcase the modding abilities that were to be added to StarCraft II. In 2011, however, development of Blizzard DOTA was rebooted and demoed at BlizzCon 2011. In comparison to the previous iteration previewed at BlizzCon 2010, the gameplay was described as "fast" and "streamlined."

Following the announcement of Dota 2 by Valve, Rob Pardo, the executive vice president of Blizzard Entertainment, expressed concern at Valve using and trademarking a name that originated from within the Warcraft III community. Following a failed trademark injunction on the part of Riot Games, Blizzard acquired Riot's subsidiary, DotA-Allstars, LLC., the original company that represented the servicing of Defense of the Ancients. Subsequently, Blizzard filed an opposition against Valve for claiming the DotA trademark. On May 11, 2012, Blizzard and Valve announced that the dispute had been settled, with Valve retaining the commercial franchising rights to the term "Dota", while Blizzard would change the name of Blizzard DOTA to Blizzard All-Stars. Blizzard, however, will retain the right to use DOTA name non-commercially. This includes promoting DOTA-style maps made for Blizzard games by the community.

In June 2012, Dustin Browder, the director of StarCraft II, stated that Blizzard All-Stars did not have a release date, but that it would definitely be after the release of StarCraft II: Heart of the Swarm. In February 2013, the Activision Blizzard fourth quarter 2012 earnings report listed Blizzard All-Stars as one of the areas of continued investment for Blizzard throughout 2013. Browder commented in March 2013 that a few artists had transitioned from the StarCraft II: Heart of the Swarm team, to work on Blizzard All-Stars for the time being along with the few designers on the team.  One challenge faced by art team, according to the senior art director Samwise Didier, was bringing in three different art styles and themes from Warcraft, StarCraft, and Diablo in line to make the art style for the game.In August 2013 the game went into wider internal testing. Blizzard president Mike Morhaime described it as Blizzard's version of an "action real-time strategy" game. The Blizzard All-Stars team was expanded in May 2013, from some of the resources who were reallocated when Blizzard's Titan project was rebooted and the team downsized. On October 17, 2013, the name of the game was changed to Heroes of the Storm.Heroes of the Storm entered a technical alpha testing phase on March 13, 2014, which went offline on September 22, 2014. The technical alpha went back online on October 7, 2014, for North America, Latin America, South East Asia, Australia, and New Zealand. The servers for Europe, Korea, China, and Taiwan went online in the following weeks. The technical alpha continued until the beginning of the closed beta. Closed beta testing started on January 13, 2015. As of February 2015, over 9 million players had signed up for eligibility to receive an invite to beta testing. The open beta of the game began on May 19, 2015, and the full version of the game was released on June 2, 2015.

Post-release
Promotions
While the game was in Alpha testing, Blizzard ran a promotion as part of the pre-order for Diablo III: Reaper of Souls which unlocked Valla as a free hero. To mark the release of Heroes of the Storm, Blizzard had crossovers implemented between Blizzard games. Players who reached account level 12 in Heroes of the Storm received the Heroes of the Storm themed card back in Hearthstone and after winning 100 play mode matches in Hearthstone received the Hearthstone Card mount in Heroes of the Storm. Players who reached account level 20 in Heroes of the Storm received a Grave Golem battle pet in World of Warcraft and after reaching level 100 in World of Warcraft received an Ironside Dire Wolf mount in Heroes of the Storm. After the Diablo hero patch, any player who purchased Diablo III was given the Diablo hero (Al'Diabolos) free for a limited time; players who reach level 12 in Heroes of the Storm will receive a unique pennant and portrait frame in Diablo III and reaching level 70 Season 4 and beyond receive Malthael's Phantom mount in Heroes of the Storm. Players who purchase the StarCraft II: Legacy of the Void deluxe or collector's editions receive a Void Seeker mount in Heroes of the Storm and purchasing any edition of Legacy of the Void unlocks the Artanis hero. Players who purchase the Origins Edition of Overwatch unlock Tracer as a free hero.

During the Nexus Challenge event (November 15, 2016 – January 4, 2017), each player who completed 15 games of Heroes of the Storm together with a friend received the Oni Genji skin, Oni Genji Portrait and Oni Genji Spray in Overwatch, and Zarya as a free hero in Heroes of the Storm. After completing 30 games with a friend, players unlocked four additional heroes (Auriel, Greymane, Kerrigan, and Li-Ming), the Orochi Hovercycle mount, and a 30-Day stimpack in Heroes of the Storm.

During the For Azeroth! event (February 14, 2017 – March 14, 2017, then extended for March 17, 2017 – March 26, 2017), each player who completed 15 games of Heroes of the Storm together with a friend while playing as a Warcraft character, received a Flames of Judgement Charger mount and a 10-day stimpack to use in-game. They also received a Primal Flamesaber mount for World of Warcraft.

During the Nexus Challenge 2.0 event (April 24, 2017 – May 22, 2017), all players could choose to permanently unlock 1 of 4 Mega Bundles; Assassin, Flex, Support & Specialist, and Tanks & Bruisers. For each of the 4 weeks of the event, players who completed 5 matches with a friend could unlock various Overwatch-themed rewards for the players' Heroes of the Storm and Overwatch accounts.

Heroes of the Storm 2.0
On March 29, 2017, game director Alan Dabiri announced Heroes of the Storm 2.0, described as "a culmination of all the ways Blizzard transformed the Nexus since launch, plus plenty of radical additions on their way". A major feature of the patch was a revamp of the player and hero progression systems. The level caps (40 for players in general, and 20 for individual heroes) were removed, and the uneven experience curve for leveling heroes was smoothed out. Another feature was the introduction of Loot Chests which contain cosmetic rewards, similar to the system used in Overwatch. In addition to heroes, skins, and mounts, the chests can also include new portraits, banners, emojis, custom announcer voices (similar to StarCraft II), hero voice lines, and graffiti sprays (both similar to Overwatch). Loot Chests can be acquired by leveling up or purchased with Gold. The in-game shop was remodeled and retitled "Collection", and two new currencies, "Gems" and "Shards", were added in addition to the existing "Gold" which was the only in-game currency before Heroes 2.0 update. A loadout system for cosmetic additions was also included. As part of the announcement, a new Diablo hero, the Amazon Cassia, was highlighted.Heroes 2.0 went into beta testing on March 29, and was released on April 25.

Downsizing
On December 13, 2018, Blizzard President J. Allen Brack and Blizzard Chief Development Officer Ray Gresko jointly announced that some developers from Heroes of the Storm would be moving to other projects, and that the game would be transitioning to a long-term support phase. Blizzard also announced the cancellation of their esports tournaments, Heroes Global Championship and Heroes of the Dorm. Members of the esports community around Heroes stated they were caught off guard by the announcement and had been told as recently as BlizzCon 2018 that HGC would continue. In a message posted on the game's official forums, production director Kaéo Milker confirmed the game would continue receiving updates and new content, though at a slower pace than before.

Blizzard officially stated in July 2022 that Heroes of the Storm would no longer see any major updates with those remaining on the development team to support the game in a maintenance mode.

 Nexus Anomalies 
Nexus Anomalies were seasonal gameplay changes that directly affected all game modes in Heroes of the Storm. These events lasted for entire ranked seasons, allowing the developers time to receive feedback on them. Depending on this evaluation, some of the new game mechanics became permanent additions to the game, while others were discarded after some time. Experience Globes were the first Nexus Anomaly, being introduced in the Deathwing patch of December 2019. As a result of this Nexus Anomaly, players no longer receive experience from simply being near enemy minion deaths, but instead need to gather an Experience Globe dropped by dying Minions, similar to the Regeneration Globes already present in the game. Before the introduction of the Nexus Anomalies, major gameplay updates were typically announced once a year, toward the end of the year. The introduction of any new Nexus Anomalies was ended on December 1, 2020, with Blizzard promising to continue attempting to improve the game in other ways.

 Setting and plot Heroes of the Storm takes place in the Nexus, a strange limbo of clashing universes which collide from across space, time, and dimensions. The Nexus exists in the center of a trans-dimensional cosmic storm and is connected to other universes. The storm of the Nexus, which has incomprehensible amounts of energy, can rip worlds and universes in and out of existence, and it can also pull worlds into stability. Some of the central realms in the Nexus, such as Raven Court, King's Crest, and Luxoria, are examples of these points of stability. Every Realm within the Nexus has one stone called "Singularity", and only the one who achieves it through conquest can become the Realm Lord. A singularity stone grants to its possessor an almost demigod-like status, but not immortality. Many powerful warriors have been sucked into the Nexus, including combatants from Azeroth, Sanctuary, and the Koprulu sector. New combatants are constantly arriving, some of them are chosen after they died in their original reality. A hero called Qhira, came into the Nexus after her world Iresia and its singularity stone were destroyed, holding only a singularity shard from Iresia, and calling it the "mother crystal".

Numerous worlds exist within the multiverse of the Nexus which are referred to as "realms". While many of these worlds are nexus-generated, some are mirrored versions of those found within Blizzard's franchises, but they can contain alternate universe versions of various heroes, indicated by hero skins in the game.

MusicHeroes of the Storm's playlist combines an original soundtrack with soundtracks from Blizzard's other franchises. The original soundtrack for Heroes of the Storm was composed by Blizzard Entertainment's composers, Glenn Stafford, and Jason Hayes. Other music in the game is present as background music, or represents specific universes with connections to the various Heroes within Heroes of the Storm. Also present within the game's playlist are soundtracks from Starcraft, such as Terran and Zerg Theme; various soundtracks from World of Warcraft, such as Obsidian Sanctum from Wrath of the Lich King, and The Wandering Isle from Mists of Pandaria; soundtracks from Diablo, such as Jungle from Diablo II (Act III), and Reaper of Souls from Diablo III; as well as soundtracks from Overwatch, such as Overture and Hanamura theme; and Smugglers Cove from The Lost Vikings 2.The Battle Begins by Glenn Stafford is the main theme of Heroes of the Storm.

ReceptionHeroes of the Storm received generally favorable reviews upon release. Metacritic calculated an average score of 86 out of 100, indicating "generally favorable reviews", based on 57 reviews.

GameSpot awarded it 9 out of 10, summarizing "A fantastic casual-competitive game that offers untold hours of enjoyment." Positive reviews praised its objective-based gameplay and greater accessibility than its competitors, with Destructoid's Chris Carter giving it a 9.5 out of 10 and calling it "A hallmark of excellence." In a review for PC Gamer, Chris Thursten focused on the game's accessibility, giving it a score of 84 out of 100 and concluding "The most any studio has done to open up a complex genre to a new audience. Inviting, entertaining, and deceptively deep."

The Escapist's CJ Miozzi stated that while its improved accessibility would make it interesting to players normally not interested in the genre, it could be less attractive to experienced players. Giving it 4 out of 5 stars, he summarized that "At the very least, it's a game that all gamers should try." Polygon's Arthur Gies approved of the title's accessibility but expressed worry that "sometimes something [felt] lost along the way," scoring it at 7.5 out of 10.

On release, IGN's Mitch Dyer gave the game a mixed review and concluded, "Heroes of the Storm'' is a flawed, varied MOBA with terrific team fighting and poor objectives," awarding it a 6.5 out of 10. This review prompted an initially negative reaction from the game's community that turned the score into an internet meme, eventually being recognized by Blizzard themselves in a humorous promotional video for an update to the game. IGN's re-review by Ian Nowakowski awarded it 8 out of 10 in March 2018, saying the game "packs a ton of variety and excellent characters. Some of this MOBA's modes work better than others, but it's a safe bet that it'll deliver a fun match."

The game was nominated for "Choice Video Game" at the 2017 Teen Choice Awards.

Notes

References

External links
 
 

2015 video games
Blizzard games
Crossover video games
Esports games
Free-to-play video games
 
Multiplayer online battle arena games
Multiplayer online games
Multiplayer video games
MacOS games
Science fantasy video games
Video games adapted into comics
Video games developed in the United States
Video games about parallel universes
Video games containing loot boxes
Windows games
D.I.C.E. Award for Strategy/Simulation Game of the Year winners